Scribonia may refer to:

Scribonia gens, a family in ancient Rome
Scribonia (wife of Octavian)
Scribonia (wife of Crassus)
 Scribonia (bug), a genus of stink bugs or shield bugs
Hypercompe scribonia, the giant leopard moth